Hilman Bernard Walker (October 10, 1912 – May 12, 1983) was an American college football player and coach and college and Minor League Baseball player. Walker played football at the University of Alabama as an end. He served as the head football coach at Arizona State Teachers College at Tempe—now known as Arizona State University— for one season, in 1942, compiling a record of 2–8. Walker was the younger brother of Hub Walker and Gee Walker, who both played in Major League Baseball.

Head coaching record

References

External links
 
 

1912 births
1983 deaths
American football ends
Baseball outfielders
Alabama Crimson Tide baseball players
Alabama Crimson Tide football coaches
Alabama Crimson Tide football players
Arizona State Sun Devils football coaches
Dayton Ducks players
Evansville Bees players
Greensburg Green Sox players
Macon Peaches players